Abolfazl Yaghoubi Jouybari (born 27 December 1996) is an Iranian Taekwondo athlete. He won a bronze medal at the 2015 World Taekwondo Championships on the under 63 kg weight category.

References 

Living people
Iranian male taekwondo practitioners
1996 births
World Taekwondo Championships medalists
Asian Taekwondo Championships medalists
20th-century Iranian people
21st-century Iranian people